rpix86 is a DOS emulator for the Raspberry Pi created by Patrick Aalto. rpix86 emulates an Intel 80486 x86 CPU running at 20MHz with 640kB of memory, 256-color Super VGA graphics at 640x480, and a Sound Blaster 2.0 sound card.
The latest version is 0.19, which was released in June 2015.

rpix86 does not have an inbuilt command-line interpreter. The user needs to have a DOS program that provides the command shell features. Currently the only supported shell is 4DOS version 7.50.

See also
 DOSBox
 Virtual DOS machine

References

External links 
 rpix86 by Patrick Aalto

DOS emulators